The Canon 7 was a focal-plane shutter rangefinder system camera with an integrated selenium light meter  introduced by Canon Inc. in September 1961, the last model compatible with the Leica M39 lens mount. Later versions, branded Canon 7s and Canon 7s Type II (or Canon 7sZ), had a cadmium sulfide light meter.

History
The Canon 7 came when the first Canon single-lens reflex cameras were already on the market, but it was felt that there was a need for a fast-shooting rangefinder camera for reportage. In this niche, the Canon 7 came into direct competition with the Leica M3.

Some Canon 7s were sold in the US branded Bell & Howell, in a partnership that lasted until 1975.

External links 
 
 Canon RF Camera Price & Info Guide
 Canon 7/7s/7sZ on cameraquest.com
 Canon 7 by Karen Nakamura
 Canon 7 on Canon Camera Museum

Canon rangefinder cameras